Malaysia–South Africa relations refers to the current and historical relationship between Malaysia and South Africa. Malaysia has a high commission in Pretoria, and South Africa has a high commission in Kuala Lumpur. Relations between the two countries have been very good and have continued to improve, with each other view themselves as close partners in the developing world. Both are full members of the Commonwealth of Nations.

History 

Following its independence, Malaysia (then the Federation of Malaya) supported moves to isolate the white minority government in South Africa and its policy of apartheid, leading to South Africa's withdrawal from the Commonwealth in 1961. It also imposed a travel ban on travel to and from South Africa, which was lifted in 1991, with a Liaison Office being established in Johannesburg the following year. Weekly direct flights between Kuala Lumpur and Johannesburg began on 26 October 1992. The two countries established diplomatic relations on 8 November 1993. In March 1997, South Africa's President Nelson Mandela made a state visit to Malaysia to strengthen economic ties between the two with the signing of several economic agreements.

Economic relations 
In 2003, South Africa request for more investments and assistance to build their economy and human resources. By the time, Malaysia is already the third largest investor in the country with its investments mainly in the telecommunications, oil and gas and hospitality sectors. By 2010, Malaysia was the fourth largest new investor in South Africa. Along the same year, Malaysia was South Africa's 20th largest total trade partner with roughly 4.8 million Rand in volume.

See also 
 Africans in Malaysia

References

Further reading 
 South Africa and Malaysia: Identity and History in South-South Relations  by Muhammed Haron, Rhodes University, June 2007
 

 
South Africa
Malaysia
South Africa
Malaysia